is a Japanese football player. He plays for Azul Claro Numazu.

Career
Kazuki Ota joined Japan Football League club Azul Claro Numazu in 2015.

Club statistics
Updated to 20 February 2019.

References

External links

Profile at Azul Claro Numazu

1993 births
Living people
Kanto Gakuin University alumni
Association football people from Shizuoka Prefecture
Japanese footballers
J3 League players
Japan Football League players
Azul Claro Numazu players
Association football midfielders